Minster-on-Sea is a civil parish in the English county of Kent. It is on the Isle of Sheppey and thus forms part of the borough of Swale. It was created in 2003.

The main populated area is the seaside town of Minster on the north coast. The southern part is primarily marshland and includes the entirely deserted village of Elmley.

References 

Civil parishes in Kent
Isle of Sheppey